Bucida ophiticola is a species of plant in the Combretaceae family. It is endemic to Cuba.  It is threatened by habitat loss.

References

Flora of Cuba
ophiticola
Endangered plants
Taxonomy articles created by Polbot